The Fădimac is a right tributary of the river Bega in Romania. It flows into the Bega near Balinț.

References

Rivers of Romania
Rivers of Timiș County